Gary James Rowe (born 5 September 1952) is an Australian politician. He was the Liberal member for Cranbourne in the Victorian Legislative Assembly from 1992 to 2002, and in 2012, he was elected as a councillor for Mayfield Ward in the City of Casey. Councillor Rowe was not re-elected to Casey City Council in October 2016, but was subsequently re-elected at a countback for Mayfield Ward in April 2017 after embattled Councillor Steve Beardon resigned just four months after being elected.

Rowe was born in Coburg, Victoria, to Douglas James and Norma Lilian Rowe. He attended Glen Waverley High School before studying at Victoria Police Academy, where he was one of the top ten graduates. In 1970 he became a police officer, but in 1974 became a consultant with National Mutual and in 1977 founded a finance and insurance company, of which he became director. He was also director of a number of other finance and insurance businesses. In 1989, he was elected to Cranbourne Shire Council, serving until 1992.

In 1992, Rowe was elected to the new seat of Cranbourne in the Victorian Legislative Assembly. Following the Kennett Government's defeat in 1999 he became Parliamentary Secretary to the Leader of the Opposition. He was defeated in 2002 by Labor candidate Jude Perera.

References

1952 births
Living people
Liberal Party of Australia members of the Parliament of Victoria
Members of the Victorian Legislative Assembly
21st-century Australian politicians
Politicians from Melbourne
People from Coburg, Victoria
20th-century Australian politicians